Herniaria lusitanica is a species of flowering plant in the family Caryophyllales. It is endemic to the Iberian Peninsula and the Berlengas archipelago.

Description
Herniaria lusitanica is an annual (subsp. lusitanica), biannual or perennial (subsp. berlengiana) plant. It has very ramified stems,  leaves and densely packed glomeruli with 4-15 flowers.

Distribution and habitat
Herniaria lusitanica is native to the Iberian Peninsula and the Berlengas archipelago of Portugal. It grows in agricultural fields, pathways and altered land in dry places.

Subspecies
It has two subspecies:
 H. lusitanica subsp. lusitanica: Native to the Iberian Peninsula.
 H. lusitanica subsp. berlengiana: Native to the Berlengas archipelago.

References

lusitanica
Flora of Portugal
Flora of Spain
Flora of Southwestern Europe